
Year 64 BC was a year of the pre-Julian Roman calendar. At the time it was known as the Year of the Consulship of Caesar and Figulus (or, less frequently, year 690 Ab urbe condita). The denomination 64 BC for this year has been used since the early medieval period, when the Anno Domini calendar era became the prevalent method in Europe for naming years.

Events 
 By place 

 Roman Republic 
 Pompey destroys the kingdom of Pontus; king Mithridates VI commits suicide after escaping to the Crimea.
 Pompey annexes Syria and captures Jerusalem, annexing Judea.

 Syria 
 King Antiochus XIII Asiaticus is deposed and killed by the Syrian chieftain Sampsiceramus I  – this is considered by some the end of the Seleucid Dynasty.
64 BC Syria earthquake, mentioned in catalogues of historical earthquakes. It affected the region of Syria and may have caused structural damage in the city of Jerusalem.

Births 
 Marcus Valerius Messalla Corvinus, Roman general and consul (d. AD 8)
 Nicolaus of Damascus, Jewish historian and philosopher (approximate date)

Deaths 
 Antiochus XIII Asiaticus, king of the Seleucid Empire

References

Bibliography